The Wisent is an 8x8 armoured logistics vehicle built by Rheinmetall. It is designed to be airliftable by the Airbus A400M.

It can be fitted with various modules, for cargo carrying, medical use, troop transport, and so on.

The Wisent can also be fitted with various weapons, including an RCWS.

References

Military vehicles introduced in the 2000s
Military trucks
Rheinmetall
MAN SE
Armoured personnel carriers of Germany
Eight-wheeled vehicles
Armoured personnel carriers of the post–Cold War period